René Ferrier (7 December 1936 – 15 September 1998) was a French professional football midfielder. He played for France at the Euro 1960.

References

External links
 Profile
 Profile

Sportspeople from Allier
1936 births
1998 deaths
French footballers
France international footballers
Association football midfielders
Ligue 1 players
Ligue 2 players
AS Saint-Étienne players
SC Bastia players
1960 European Nations' Cup players
French football managers
Footballers from Auvergne-Rhône-Alpes